Thomas Tower (1698? – 2 September 1778) of Weald House, Essex was a British lawyer and Member of Parliament.

He was born the second son of Christopher Tower, snr and the younger brother of Christopher Tower. After being educated at Harrow School (c.1711) and Trinity College, Oxford (1717) he entered the Inner Temple in 1717 to study law, being called to the bar in 1722 and becoming a bencher in 1751.

In 1728 Tower succeeded his father to Mansfield, Buckinghamshire, and uncle Richard Hale to his Buckinghamshire and Essex estates. He was elected to Parliament for Wareham in 1729, sitting until 1734, after which he represented Wallingford from 1734 to 1741.

In 1732, he became an active trustee and councilman for the newly formed colony of Georgia on the east coast of America.

He bought Weald House near Brentwood, Essex, in 1759 and was High Sheriff of Essex for 1760–1761. He died unmarried in 1778.

See also
 Trustees for the Establishment of the Colony of Georgia in America

References

|-

1778 deaths
People educated at Harrow School
Alumni of Trinity College, Oxford
Members of the Inner Temple
Members of the Parliament of Great Britain for English constituencies
British MPs 1734–1741
British MPs 1741–1747
High Sheriffs of Essex
Year of birth uncertain